Stein Olav Bjortomt (pronounced Bortom) (born 13 December 1978 in Eastbourne) is an English international quiz player, four-time world champion (2003, 2015, 2018, 2019) and three time individual European champion (2010, 2014, 2015). He is the star player of the world's most successful quizzing clubs, Broken Hearts, with which he has won several European championships. He writes questions for University Challenge and The Chase.

In contrast to the other two full-time professionals of Team England Pat Gibson and Kevin Ashman he has not done as well both in domestic competitions, with only a second place in the individual British championships 2007 to his credit (though he has won the pairs competition) and as a TV candidate, a second place in the Fifteen to One series of 2002 being his best result. He is of Norwegian and Filipino descent.

National and international titles 
He was the winner of the inaugural 2003 individual World Quizzing Championships, when it was a fledgling event with then only 45 participants (now in the thousands) but won a second title in 2015. In 2009 he won three out of four possible European titles and was runner-up behind Kevin Ashman in the singles to become the most successful participant.

Time Out described him in 2006 as a "former child quiz prodigy and a rising star of the quiz world".

After his triumph at the very first World Quizzing Championship 2003 he did not win a medal at the world stage for twelve years, but always was Top 10. His absence at Ghent in 2004 (when England won the first European Championship) meant he was not selected for the national team until 2006. He should have played in 2007 but travel problems delayed his arrival at the event. Consequently, he has only latterly become a regular in the star-studded English national team (Ashman, Mark Bytheway and Pat Gibson).  He is also part of the Broken Hearts ( with Ian Bayley, formerly David Stainer, replaced by Didier Bruyere and Mark Grant) quiz team which play in the QLL and have been European Club champions from 2007 to 2009. Bjortomt won the Pairs Championships with partner Stainer in 2009 and has won 21 international medals on aggregate (see medal table).  He also holds the title "British Quizzing Grandmaster".

TV appearances 
Bjortomt's success on TV has been rather moderate compared with that of his teammates in the national team, and he describes himself as a "choker" (see Q&A link).

He appeared on the quiz show Fifteen to One four times, finishing as a series runner-up in 2002.

He captained the University of Nottingham team to the quarter-finals in the 1999–2000 series of BBC's University Challenge, and according to the credits of the show as of 2012, is currently a question setter. When he appeared on the Channel 4 quiz show Grand Slam in 2003, commentator James Richardson described him as the "Wayne Rooney of the quiz world."

In 2007, Bjortomt competed in The National Lottery People's Quiz and was the first contestant to qualify for the grand final, answering 97 per cent of his questions correctly during the show.

In 2008, he appeared in the quiz programme Battle of the Brains.

On 10 October 2008 he appeared on Mastermind, scoring eight points on questions about West Indies Test cricket, and fourteen in the General Knowledge section, to finish in second place.

In 2008 and 2009 he unsuccessfully competed in Are You an Egghead?, which attempts to find another player to join the existing team.

In 2021 he became part of the Channel 5 quiz show Eggheads.

Book 
National Quiz Team: The Only Quiz Book You Will Ever Need (co author)

Personal details 
In 2001 Bjortomt was the winner of The Guardian&apos;s Student Feature writer of the Year award. He has a History degree from the University of Nottingham and a Postgraduate Diploma in Newspaper Journalism from Nottingham Trent University. He worked for The Times newspaper in London and has set the weekday Times2 quiz since July 2005 to the present day along with The Times Saturday quiz.

His parents are Norwegian and Filipino. He has two younger sisters and a younger brother.

References

External links
His Quiz blog (Not updated since December 2016)

English people of Filipino descent
English people of Norwegian descent
Alumni of the University of Nottingham
Living people
IQA team event gold medalists
Contestants on British game shows
Contestants on University Challenge
1978 births